Roland Kayn (born 3 September 1933 in Reutlingen, Germany; died 5 January 2011 in Nieuwe Pekela, Netherlands) was a  composer of electronic music. He is known for his lengthy works of cybernetic music.

From 1952 to 1955 he studied composition and organ at the State University of Music and Performing Arts Stuttgart. From 1956 to 1958 he studied with Tamara Blacher and Josef Rufer in Berlin. After 1960 he lived in Rome and then in Venice. In 1964 he co-founded the free improvisation group Gruppo di Improvvisazione Nuova Consonanza. Beginning in 1970 he worked at the Institute of Sonology in Utrecht, (which later moved to The Hague) and lived in the Netherlands until his death in 2011. In 1995 he created the label Reiger-records-reeks to release his own works.

His 14-hour composition A Little Electronic Milky Way of Sound (2009) was released on 16 CDs in October 2017 by the Finnish label Frozen Reeds.

Discography
 1977 – Simultan (Colosseum, 3 LPs)
 1977 – Elektroakustische Projekte  (Colosseum, 3 LPs)
 1981 – Makro I–III (Colosseum, 3 LPs)
 1981 – Infra (Colosseum, 4 LPs)
 1984 – Tektra (Colosseum, 6 LPs)
 1994 – Keyboard-Works 1 (Reiger-records-reeks, 2 CDs)
 1995 – Works for Orchestra / Ensemble (RRR, 2 CDs)
 1995 – Cybernetic Music (RRR, 2 CDs)
 1997 – Cybernetic Music II (RRR, 1 CD)
 1996 – Cybernetic Music III (RRR, 2 CDs)
 1997 – Electronic Symphony I–III / Equivalence Sonore II–III (RRR, 2 CDs)
 1998 – Electronic Symphony IV / Frottage – Minimax (RRR, 2 CDs)
 1998 – Electronic Symphony V / Emissioni trasformati I–II (RRR, 2 CDs)
 1999 – Electronic Symphony VI–VII / Frottage II (RRR, 2 CDs)
 2000 – Electronic Symphony VIII–X (RRR, 2 CDs)
 2000 – Gärten der Lüste / Cybernetics II / L’innominata (RRR, 2 CDs)
 2003 – Ultra / Redunancy TR / Megaphonie (RRR, 2 CDs)
 2004 – Requiem pour Patrice Lumumba / Interations / Composizione AD / Prismes Reflectes (RRR, 2 CDs)
 2005 – Etoile du nord / Ghyress für Ilse-Emily Kayn (RRR, 2 CDs)
 2006 – Invisible Music / Hommage à K.R.H. Sonderborg (RRR, 2 CDs)
 2017 – A Little Electronic Milky Way of Sound (Frozen Reeds, 16 CDs)
 2019 – Scanning (RRR, 10 CDs)
 2020 – The Man and the Biosphere (RRR, digital)
 2020 – Music for the Isle of Man (RRR, digital)
 2020 – Made in the NL After the Sixties and Beyond (RRR, digital)
 2020 – Sound-Hydra (RRR, digital)
 2020 – November Music (RRR, digital)
 2020 – Dino Concerto (RRR, digital)
 2020 – A Pan-Air Music (RRR, digital)
 2021 – Electronic Symphony I–III (RRR, digital)
 2021 – Matego I–II (RRR, digital)
 2021 – Electronic Symphony IV (RRR, digital)
 2021 – Accumulation (RRR, digital)
 2021 – Electronic Symphony V (RRR, digital)
 2021 – Xutus (RRR, digital)
 2021 – Electronic Symphony VI & VII (RRR, digital)
 2021 – Spectral (RRR, digital)
 2021 – Reflets du Spectral (RRR, digital)
 2021 – Extensity (RRR, digital)
 2021 – Zone Senza Silenzio (RRR, digital)
 2021 – Remake A (RRR, digital)
 2021 – Remake B (RRR, digital)
 2021 – Transit (RRR, digital)
 2021 – Cybernet AS & TLS (RRR, digital)
 2021 – Agila (RRR, digital)
 2021 – An Algorithm MA 71 (RRR, digital)
 2022 – Impactions (RRR, digital)
 2022 – The Art of Sound (RRR, digital)
 2022 – Triades (RRR, digital)
 2022 – Contra-Compositie (RRR, digital)
 2022 – De-Compositie (RRR, digital)
 2022 – Atix (RRR, digital)
 2022 – Reversioni Comprimati (RRR, digital)
 2022 – Abstracta (RRR, digital)
 2022 – Mutenaces (RRR, digital)
 2022 – Cyber Panoramical Music (RRR, digital)
 2022 – Sonority ERT (RRR, digital)
 2022 – Audiogenic Events (RRR, digital)
 2023 – Otron (RRR, digital)
 2023 – Yellowings Conglomerations (RRR, digital)
 2023 – Rathan (RRR, digital)
 2023 – Ghyress (RRR, digital)

References

External links

Roland Kayn at Bandcamp

1933 births
2011 deaths
20th-century classical composers
21st-century classical composers
Electroacoustic music composers
German electronic musicians
People from Reutlingen